The year 666 BC was a year of the pre-Julian Roman calendar. In the Roman Empire, it was known as year 88 Ab urbe condita . The denomination 666 BC for this year has been used since the early medieval period, when the Anno Domini calendar era became the prevalent method in Europe for naming years.

Events

By place

Middle East

 King Ashurbanipal resigns and is replaced by a mock king.
 The court astrologers predict doom and disaster upon Assyria.

Births

References

660s BC